P'iq'iñ Q'ara (Aymara p'iq'iña head, q'ara bare, bald, p'iq'iña q'ara bald, "baldheaded", also spelled Phequen Khara) or P'iq'iñ Qala (Aymara qala stone, "bare stone", also spelled Pekhen Khala) is a mountain in the Andes of Bolivia which reaches a height of approximately . It is located in the La Paz Department, Loayza Province, Malla Municipality, north of Malla. The Malla Jawira flows along its eastern slopes.

References 

Mountains of La Paz Department (Bolivia)